The 2018 season was the 104th in Sociedade Esportiva Palmeiras' existence. This season Palmeiras participated in the Campeonato Paulista, Copa Libertadores, Copa do Brasil and the Série A.

Players

Squad information 
As of the end of the season.

Transfers

Transfers in

Transfers out

Transfer summary

Expenditure
Summer:  R$0

Winter:  R$2m

Total:  R$2m

Income
Summer:  R$79.2m

Winter:  R$48m

Total:  R$127.2m

Net totals
Summer:  R$79.2m

Winter:  R$46m

Total:  R$125.2m ($31m USD)

Competitions

Overview

Friendlies

Mid-season friendlies 
During the break for the 2018 FIFA World Cup, Palmeiras disputed three friendly matches, two in Panama and one in Costa Rica.

Campeonato Paulista

First stage 
Palmeiras was drawn on the Group C.

Quarterfinal

Semifinal

Final

Copa Libertadores

Group stage 

The draw was held on December 20, 2017. Palmeiras was drawn on Group 8.

Round of 16 

The draw for the round of 16 was held on 4 June 2018, 20:00 PYT (UTC−4), at the CONMEBOL Convention Centre in Luque, Paraguay.

Quarterfinal

Semifinal

Campeonato Brasileiro

Standings

Matches 
The match schedule was released on February 5, 2018.

Results by round

Copa do Brasil 

As a team that disputed the Copa Libertadores, Palmeiras entered in the round of 16. The draw was held on April 20, 2018.

Round of 16

Quarterfinal 
The draw for the quarterfinal was held on May 30, 2018.

Semifinal 
A draw was held on August 22, 2018 to define the order of the matches.

Statistics

Overall statistics

Goalscorers 
In italic players who left the team in mid-season.

Hat-tricks

(H) – Home ; (A) – Away

Clean sheets
Last updated on 9 September 2018.

References

External links 
 Official site 

2018
Palmeiras